Cyrus Paul Kahl (November 29, 1904July 30, 1971) was an American football player.  He played college football as the fullback for the North Dakota Flickertails and led the team to consecutive conference championships in 1928 and 1929. He then played professional football in the National Football League (NFL) as a back for the Portsmouth Spartans in 1930 and 1931. He appeared in 11 games during the 1930 season.

References

1904 births
1971 deaths
People from Wells County, North Dakota
Players of American football from North Dakota
North Dakota Fighting Hawks football players
Portsmouth Spartans players